This is a List of battles from 301 A.D. to 1300 A.D.

4th century

5th century

6th century

7th century

8th century

9th century

10th century

11th century

12th century

13th century

See also
 List of Byzantine battles

References

0601